The men's welterweight boxing competition at the 2012 Olympic Games in London was held between 31 July and 12 August at the ExCeL Exhibition Centre.

Twenty-eight boxers from 28 nations competed.

Competition format
The competition consisted of a single-elimination tournament.  Bronze medals were awarded to both semifinal losers.  Bouts were three rounds of three minutes each.

Schedule 
All times are British Summer Time (UTC+1)

Results

Finals

Top half

Bottom half

*Spence successfully appealed his initial 11–13 loss. Using video review, AIBA determined the bout referee gave too few cautions for holding fouls and should have awarded Spence at least four more points.

References

Boxing at the 2012 Summer Olympics
Men's events at the 2012 Summer Olympics